Ryan Barrow Succop ( "suck-up"; born September 19, 1986) is an American football placekicker for the Tampa Bay Buccaneers of the National Football League (NFL). Succop played college football at South Carolina and was the 2009 Mr. Irrelevant by virtue of being selected by the Kansas City Chiefs with the final pick of the 2009 NFL Draft. Succop was the Buccaneers starting placekicker in their 31–9 victory over the Chiefs in Super Bowl LV, becoming the first Mr. Irrelevant to play and win a Super Bowl as a starter and an active player.

Early years
Succop attended Hickory High School in Hickory, North Carolina. He was a four-time all-conference and two-time all-state performer, and was named a three-time conference special teams Player of the Year. Succop also played soccer, where he was a three-time all-state selection and scored 104 career goals. He was rated the fourth-best kicker in the nation and the sixteenth-best prospect in North Carolina by Rivals.com.

College career
Succop attended the University of South Carolina. He performed kicking, punting, and kickoff duties for the Gamecocks. His 251 career points ranks 10th on South Carolina's all-time list.

In 2005, as a freshman, he was the kickoff specialist and backup placekicker behind Josh Brown. He kicked off fifty-nine times for a 62.3 yard average with twenty-nine touchbacks. He had two field goal attempts, missing both.

In 2006, as a sophomore, he was named SEC Special Teams Player of the Week after a game where he was 3-for-3 on field goals against Mississippi State. Succop handled the kicking and punting duties for the Gamecocks during his sophomore and senior seasons. He scored 85 points in 2006, which led the team and was the third-highest single-season total in school history. He also earned second-team All-SEC honors, and was named a semi-finalist for the Lou Groza Award.

In 2007, as a junior, Succop was named an Associated Press honorable mention All-SEC selection. He also earned SEC first-team preseason honors as a placekicker by the media. He was a second-team selection by the coaches and earned preseason second-team All-SEC honors as a punter by both the media and coaches. He was once again a Lou Groza Award candidate, and he was also named to the Ray Guy Award watch list. He went 13-for-17 in field goal attempts, earning SEC Special Teams Player of the Week honors after making all three field goals in a game. As a senior, Succop participated in all thirteen games and connected on twenty of thirty field goals which was good enough for fourth in the SEC in percentage but was the most in both attempts and makes.

In 2008, as a senior, Succop converted all 30 extra point attempts and was 20-of-30 on field goal attempts.

College statistics

Professional career

Kansas City Chiefs

Succop was drafted by the Kansas City Chiefs as the final selection, 256th overall, of the 2009 NFL Draft, earning him the title of Mr. Irrelevant. He said of being drafted last, "I didn't choose to be Mr. Irrelevant. It just worked out that way. I'm just trying not to get caught up in it and focus more on the task at hand, which is trying to come in here and help the team. It's not one of those things I really think about too much, to be honest."

Succop and the Chiefs agreed on a three-year deal worth up to $1.2 million on June 17, 2009. Succop competed with Connor Barth for the job until Barth was released in July 2009.

On November 22, 2009, Succop kicked a 22-yard field goal in overtime to give Kansas City a 27–24 win over the Pittsburgh Steelers.

Succop finished his rookie season tying an NFL record for highest field goal percentage by a rookie in a season with 86.2%. He passed Hall of Famer Jan Stenerud for most field goals made by a rookie in Chiefs history. He earned the Chiefs' 2009 Mack Lee Hill Award and scored more points, 104, than any other rookie in the NFL that year, the most by a Chiefs rookie.  Succop was named to NFL's All-Rookie team his rookie year.

On October 31, 2010, Succop made a 35-yard, game-winning field goal as time expired in overtime over the Buffalo Bills, 13–10. In the 2010 season, Succop converted all 42 extra point attempts and 20 of 26 field goal attempts.

In Week 4 of the 2011 season, Succop converted five field goal attempts and one extra point try in a 22–17 victory over the Minnesota Vikings. He earned AFC Special Teams Player of the Week for his game against the Vikings. In Week 8, Succop made a field goal in overtime to beat the San Diego Chargers. In Week 14, against Green Bay, he converted all four field goal attempts and one extra point in the 19–14 victory. He earned AFC Special Teams Player of the Week for his game against Green Bay. In the 2011 season, Succop converted all 20 extra point attempts and 24 of 30 field goal attempts. At the end of the 2011 season, Succop signed a five-year contract extension worth $14 million, which includes $2 million in guaranteed salary.

On September 23, 2012, Succop went 6-for-6 and became the Chiefs' all-time leader in field goals en route to a 27–24 OT win at the New Orleans Saints. In the 2012 season, Succop converted all 17 extra point attempts and 28 of 34 of field goal attempts.

In Week 8 of the 2013 season, Succop converted three of four field goal attempts and two extra point tries in the 23–17 victory over the Cleveland Browns. He earned AFC Special Teams Player of the Week for his game against Cleveland. On December 29, 2013, Succop missed a 41-yard field goal against the San Diego Chargers with 4 seconds remaining in regulation. This caused the game to go into overtime and allowed the Chargers to win. Succop finished the 2013 season converting all 52 extra point attempts and 22 of 28 field goal attempts.

Succop was waived on August 30, 2014, during the Chiefs final preseason cuts in a salary-cap move.

Tennessee Titans

2014 season
Succop was signed by the Tennessee Titans to a one-year contract on September 1, 2014. His first game for the Titans was on September 7 against the Kansas City Chiefs; he made four field goal attempts and converted two extra points as the Titans won by a score of 26–10. He was re-signed after the season to a three-year $7.2 million contract. In the 2014 season, Succop converted all 27 extra point attempts and 19 of 22 field goal attempts.

2015 season
In the 2015 season, Succop went 29-of-31 on extra point attempts and 14-of-16 on field goal attempts.

2016 season
In Week 15 of the 2016 season, Succop was named the AFC Special Teams Player of the Week after hitting a game-winning 53-yard field goal in the final seconds of a 19–17 win over the Kansas City Chiefs. In the 2016 season he converted 39-of-41 extra point attempts and 22-of-24 field goal attempts.

2017 season
Succop won AFC Special Teams Player of the Month for September 2017 for going 10-of-11 on field goals, converting eight extra points, and leading the NFL with 38 points. In a Week 6 victory against the Indianapolis Colts, Succop converted all five field goal attempts and set a record for the most consecutive field goals inside 50 yards, earning him AFC Special Teams Player of the Week for the fifth time in his career. In Week 7, the Titans won in overtime 12–9 against the Cleveland Browns when Succop kicked the game-winning field goal. Succop finished the 2017 season with career highs of 136 points and 35 field goals. His 42 field goal attempts led the league in 2017.

2018 season

On February 20, 2018, Succop signed a five-year, $20 million contract extension with the Titans. Succop finished the 2018 season going 26-of-30 for field goals and 28-of-31 for extra points.

2019 season
After offseason knee surgery, Succop was placed on injured reserve on September 4, 2019. His replacement was Cairo Santos, who replaced Succop in Kansas City in 2014. He was designated for return from injured reserve on October 23, 2019, and began practicing with the team. He was added to the active roster on November 2, 2019. He was placed on injured reserve on December 18, 2019, ending his season.
On March 13, 2020, Succop was released by the Titans after six seasons.

Tampa Bay Buccaneers

2020 season 
On September 1, 2020, Succop signed a one-year deal with the Tampa Bay Buccaneers. In Week 8 against the New York Giants on Monday Night Football, Succop was 4-for-4 on field goal attempts during the 25–23 win. On November 4, 2020, Succop was named the NFC Special Teams Player of the Week in Week 8. He was placed on the reserve/COVID-19 list by the team on December 15, 2020, and activated three days later. In Week 17 against the Atlanta Falcons, Succop went 3-for-3 on field goals and 5-for-5 on extra point in a 44–27 win. Succop was named the NFC Special Teams Player of the Week for his game against Atlanta. Overall, Succop finished 28 of 31 on field goals attempts and 52 of 57 on extra points attempts in the 2020 season. He set a franchise record for points scored in a season with 136,  breaking Matt Bryant's mark of 131 from 2008.

In Super Bowl LV against his former team, the Kansas City Chiefs, Succop went 4-for-4 on extra points and 1-for-1 on field goal attempts in a 31–9 victory, becoming in the process the first Mr. Irrelevant to play and win a Super Bowl as a starter and an active player.

2021 season 
On March 25, 2021, Succop signed a three-year, $12 million contract extension with the Buccaneers. In week 1, he made the game-winning field goal in the final seconds for a 31–29 win over the Dallas Cowboys. He also had another game-winning field goal in week 4 against the New England Patriots, in a 19–17 win. Overall, Succop finished 25 of 30 on field goals attempts and 56 of 59 on extra points attempts in the 2021 season. His extra points made and attempted led the league in the 2021 season.

2022 season 
In week 1 against the Dallas Cowboys, Succop went 4-for-5 on field goals and 1-for-1 on extra point in a 19–3 win.  In week 16 against the Arizona Cardinals, he made the game-winning field goal in overtime for a 19–16 win.  Overall, Succop finished 31 of 38 on field goals attempts and 24 of 25 on extra points attempts in the 2022 season.

NFL career statistics

Regular season

Postseason

Records

League

 Highest field goal percentage by a rookie in a season (86.2)
 Most consecutive successful field goals from inside 50 yards (56)

Chiefs

 Most field goals made by a rookie (25)
 Most field goals made in a single game (6, September 23, 2012)

Titans

 Most consecutive successful field goals from inside 50 yards (56)

Buccaneers
 Most points scored in a season (136, 2020)

Personal life
Succop married in 2011. The couple had their first child, a son, in 2015 and they also had a daughter. Succop is a Christian.

References

External links

 Tampa Bay Buccaneers bio

1986 births
Living people
American football placekickers
Kansas City Chiefs players
South Carolina Gamecocks football players
Tampa Bay Buccaneers players
Tennessee Titans players
People from Hickory, North Carolina
Players of American football from North Carolina